I Am the Guilty One (Turkish: Suçlu benim) is a 1953 Turkish drama film directed by Semih Evin and starring Zeynep Sirmali, Sadri Alisik and Kemal Edige.

Cast
 Zeynep Sirmali 
 Sadri Alisik 
 Kemal Edige 
 Settar Körmükçü 
 Hayri Esen 
 Muazzez Arçay
 Feridun Çölgeçen 
 Melih Kaya
 Çetin Yilmaz

References

Bibliography
 Türker İnanoğlu. 5555 afişle Türk Sineması. Kabalcı, 2004.

External links
 

1953 films
1953 drama films
1950s Turkish-language films
Turkish drama films
Turkish black-and-white films